Bank of Africa Ghana Limited, also referred to as BOA Ghana, is a commercial bank in Ghana. It is one of the commercial banks licensed by Bank of Ghana, the central bank of Ghana, and the national banking regulator. the bank has 33 branches in 2015.

BOA Ghana is a large financial services provider in Ghana. , the total asset valuation of the bank was estimated at US$300 million (GHS:735.5 million). The bank is a member of Bank of Africa Group, a multinational, Pan African bank headquartered in Bamako, Mali, with presence in fourteen African countries, including Benin, Burkina Faso, Burundi, Democratic Republic of the Congo, Djibouti, Ghana, Kenya, Ivory Coast, Madagascar, Mali, Niger, Senegal, Tanzania and Uganda. The group also maintains an office in Paris, France.

History
The bank was incorporated in 1997, as Amalgamated Bank Limited. In 2006, Meeky Enterprises of Nigeria, acquired 49% shareholding in AmalBank. At that time, Meeky was also a major shareholder in Oceanic Bank, a Nigerian financial services provider which was later acquired by Ecobank Nigeria. In April 2011, majority shareholding (60%) in AmalBank was acquired by the Bank of Africa Group. AmalBank rebranded to Bank of Africa (Ghana)

Ownership
The stock of Bank of Africa (Ghana) is owned by the following corporate entities and individuals.

Branch network
In 2015, the bank had 23 branches at the following locations:

 Farrar Avenue Branch – C131/3 Farrar Avenue, Adabraka, Accra
 Amakom Business Office – 323 24 February Road, Amakom, Kumasi
 Adum Business Office – 10 Mission Road, Adum, Kumasi
 Maamobi Business Office – Hertz House, Nima Highway, Accra
 New Town Business Office – B Plaza, Hill Street at New Town-Pigfarm Road, New Town 
 Accra Central Business Office – Ollivant Arcade, Accra Central
 Ridge Business Office – C875 A/3 Kanda Highway Extension, Ridge, Accra
 Michel Camp Road Business Office – Aseidua Plaza, Tulaku, Tema
 Spintex Business Office – Batsona-Spintex Road, Tema
 Tamale Business Office – 8 Daboya Street, Old Market, Tamale
 Osu Business Office – Cantonments Road, Cantonments, Osu
 Takoradi Business Office – 10 Market Circle, Takoradi
 Kwashieman Business Office – 248 Motorway Extension, Kwashieman, Accra
 East Legon Business Office – 38B Lagos Avenue, East Legon, Accra
 Dansoman Business Office – 300 Dansoman Estates, Dansoman, Accra 
 Madina Business Office – Hollywood Road at Madina Zongo, Madina
 Abossey Okai Business Office – Mortuary Road, Abossey Okai, Accra
 Tema Business Office – Tema Town Centre, Tema
 Sokoban Agency – Office Space# 1, Sokoban Wood Village, Kumasi

External links
Bank of Africa Ghana Limited Homepage
Bank of Africa Group Acquires 60% Ownership In AmalBank

See also

 Bank of Africa Group
 List of banks in Ghana
 AmalBank
 Economy of Ghana
 Bank of Africa Kenya Limited
 Bank of Africa Rwanda Limited
 Bank of Africa Tanzania Limited
 Bank of Africa Uganda Limited

References

Banks of Ghana
Companies based in Accra
Banks established in 1997
Bank of Africa Group
Ghanaian companies established in 1997